First aid is assistance given to any person suffering a sudden illness or injury.

It may also refer to:

First aid kit, supplies for giving first aid
First aid room, a place where first aid is administered
First aid blanket, a blanket which may be used to reduce heat loss in a patient's body
Mental health first aid, help given to people with mental health problems
Psychological first aid, a technique devised to help with post-traumatic stress disorder
Pet first aid, assistance given to pets and other animals

Organisations
St. Andrew's First Aid, a Scottish charity
First Aid Nursing Yeomanry, a British charity
First Aid Africa, a British charity

Other uses
Disk First Aid, a software utility made by Apple Inc.
First Aid (Transformers), a fictional robot superhero character in the Transformers robot superhero franchise.
First Aid (TV series), a 1930s British television series
"First Aid", a story by Anton Chekhov
First Aid (film), a 1931 American film
"First Aid for Dora", a story by P.G. Wodehouse
First Aid, a single by Super8 & Tab, 2005

See also
First aid kit (disambiguation)